R75 may refer to:
 R75 (South Africa), a road
 R-75 (Stargate), a fictional alien race in Stargate
 BMW R75, a motorcycle
 Colt R75, a machine gun
 , a destroyer of the Royal Navy